Thembi Seete (born 25 March 1977), is a South African actress, singer, rapper, television presenter and model. She is best known as a member of former kwaito group Boom Shaka. Currently, she plays the role of "Gladys" in the Mzansi Magic telenovela Gomora.

Personal life
Seete was born on 25 March 1977 in Soweto, Gauteng, South Africa. Her father died in 2014. She grew up in Sebokeng in the Vaal with aunt and uncle. Her mother Rebecca Seete succumbed to a brain tumor in July 2021.

She has one son, Dakalo, who was born in April 2018, by businessman Collen Mashawana.

Career
In 1994, she became one of the members of the kwaito supergroup called Boom Shaka. She continued to perform in the group until the group split in 2000. Then in 2000, she made her debut film with Hijack Stories in a minor role. Then she joined with the SABC1 drama serial Yizo Yizo. Meanwhile, she sang the track "Sure Ntombazana" for the soundtrack to Yizo Yizo season 2. In the same year, she joined with SABC1 drama serial Gaz’lam, where she played the role "Lerato" until 2004. She continued to perform as a singer, where she released her debut solo album "Lollipop" in 2001. After the success, she released the second album "S’matsatsa", which included popular solo tracks such as; "Shayi Zandla" and "Mphate Kahle". In 2005, she acted in the direct-to-video film Crossing the Line by playing the role of "Pumla". Meanwhile in 2006, she made her first leading role in SABC1 soccer drama serial Zone 14. In the serial, she played the role of "Nina Moloi" for four seasons with good reviews.

In 2009, she released ‘black diamond’-via-adult contemporary album Music Is My Life.

In 2014, she acted in the Mzansi Magic film The Gift. In the same year, she co-hosted the Mzansi Magic show The Juice with Bob Mabena. In the meantime, she joined with the popular e.tv soapie Rhythm City with the role of "Bongi". In 2020, she made another popular television role "Gladys" in Mzansi Magic telenovela Gomora.

In 2020, she appeared in the Netflix original Kings of Joburg.

In 2021, she was a guest judge in one episode of the seventeenth season of Mzansi Magic singing reality competition, Idols South Africa.

Apart from acting, she also working as a beautician, where she owns the salon "Azuri".

In February 2022, Seete was announced  to be a judge on season 18 of Idols South Africa.

Filmography

References

External links
 IMDb

Living people
South African film actresses
South African television actresses
1977 births